Yours Sincerely may refer to:

"Yours sincerely", a valediction in a business letter
Yours Sincerely (The Pasadenas album), 1992
Yours Sincerely (Anna Bergendahl album), 2010
Yours Sincerely (film), a 1933 musical short starring Lanny Ross and Nancy Welford
Yours Sincerely, Jim Reeves, a posthumous album by Jim Reeves, 1966

See also
Sincerely Yours (disambiguation)